Russell "Rusty" Stewart (born 9 October 1960 in Melbourne) is an Australian former professional darts player. He used the nickname Rusty for his matches.

Playing career
Stewart was one of the most successful Australian darts players of the 1980s, Australian Singles Champion four times (1988, 1989, 1993 and 1994), also Pacific Masters Champion three times (1983, 1984, 1990), winning the Australian Masters five times in six years (1983, 1984, 1985, 1987, 1988) and the Australian Grand Masters six times in three different decades (1987, 1988, 1989, 1990, 1993, 2001). He won Pacific Cup singles on two occasions in Tokyo, Japan and Vancouver, Canada. His only major title won on UK soil was the Scottish Open in 1983, but he twice reached the semi-finals of the MFI World Matchplay and was also a quarter-finalist at the Winmau World Masters in 1985 and 1988. He came runner up to Eric Bristow MBE in then the world's richest dart tournament the World Grand Prix – Tokyo 1988. He obtained his highest world ranking position in November 1989 at No. 2 to Bob Anderson who was the No. 1 ranked player.

He made his World Championship debut in 1984, but lost in the first round to Peter Locke. He competed eleven times at the BDO World Championship, but failed to progress beyond the last sixteen. Between 1985 and 1991, he suffered defeats to some of the best players of the era including to Bob Anderson in 1988 and Phil Taylor in 1990 during their world title runs.

Stewart represented Australia in seven WDF World Cup teams; 1983 Edinburgh, Scotland, 1985 Brisbane, Australia, 1987 Copenhagen, Denmark, 1989 Toronto, Canada, 1993 Las Vegas, United States, 1995 Basel, Switzerland and 2001 Kuala Lumpur, Malaysia.

Stewart was runner-up in the 1985 WDF World Cup pairs with Frank Palko, lost to Eric Bristow and John Lowe by 0–4.

After eight successive appearances in the world championships, he missed out in 1992 and 1993 but returned to the event in 1994 following the loss of many top players who left to form the World Darts Council. He went out to Bobby George in the first round in 1994 and to Richie Burnett in the second round in 1995 – Burnett went on to take the title.

Stewart only managed to qualify for the World Championship on one further occasion – when he suffered a first round defeat to Mervyn King in 2002.

Stewart continued to compete in darts tournaments in his native country – adding more titles to his collection. He narrowly missed out on qualification for the 2006 PDC World Darts Championship, losing in the final of the Oceanic Masters to Warren Parry and suffered a semi-final defeat to 15-year-old Mitchell Clegg the following year. Stewart finally captured the Oceanic Masters in 2008 and earned qualification for the 2009 PDC World Darts Championship. It was his PDC World Championship debut and only his second appearance in any version of the World Championship in 14 years. He was beaten 3–1 in the first round by Adrian Lewis.

Outside darts
Stewart earns his living working for the Australian Government in Canberra.

World Championship results

BDO

 1984: 1st Round (lost to Peter Locke 0–2) (sets)
 1985: 2nd Round (lost to Jocky Wilson 1–3)
 1986: 1st Round (lost to Malcolm Davies 1–3)
 1987: 1st Round (lost to Cliff Lazarenko 2–3)
 1988: 2nd Round (lost to Bob Anderson 0–3)
 1989: 2nd Round (lost to Dennis Hickling 0–3)
 1990: 1st Round (lost to Phil Taylor 1–3)
 1991: 2nd Round (lost to Bob Anderson 2–3)
 1994: 1st Round (lost to Bobby George 0–3)
 1995: 2nd Round (lost to Richie Burnett 1–3)
 2002: 1st Round (lost to Mervyn King 1–3)

PDC
 2009: 1st Round (lost to Adrian Lewis 1–3)

Performance timeline

References

External links
Stats on Darts Database

1960 births
Australian darts players
Living people
Place of birth missing (living people)
British Darts Organisation players
Professional Darts Corporation associate players
People from Canberra
People from Melbourne